Heinz Ebeling (2 January 1918 – 30 November 1987) was a German Luftwaffe military aviator and fighter ace during World War II. He is credited with 18 aerial victories achieved in 163 combat missions, all of which claimed over the Western Allies during the Battle of France and Battle of Britain.

Born in Karlsruhe, Ebeling grew up in the Weimar Republic and Nazi Germany. He joined the military service of the Luftwaffe where he was trained as a fighter pilot. Following flight training, he was posted to Jagdgeschwader 26 "Schlageter" (JG 26—26th Fighter Wing) in December 1939. Flying with this wing, Ebeling claimed his first aerial victory on 17 May 1940 over a French Air Force fighter aircraft. In August 1940, he was appointed squadron leader of 9. Staffel (9th squadron) of JG 26. This unit was then converted to a fighter-bomber unit. Ebeling was awarded the Knight's Cross of the Iron Cross on 5 November 1940. That day, he collided with his wingman over England and was taken prisoner of war. Ebeling died on 30 November 1987 in Austria.

Early life and career
Ebeling was born 2 January 1918 in Karlsruhe, at the time in the Grand Duchy of Baden as part of the German Empire. Following flight training, he was posted to 8. Staffel (8th squadron) of Jagdgeschwader 26 "Schlageter" (JG 26—26th Fighter Wing) in December 1939. At the time, 8. Staffel was commanded by Oberleutnant Eduard Neumann. The squadron was subordinated to III. Gruppe (3rd group) which was headed by Major Ernst Freiherr von Berg, and was under the overall command of Geschwaderkommodore (wing commander) Oberst Eduard Ritter von Schleich. Based at Essen-Mülheim Aifield, the unit was equipped with the Messerschmitt Bf 109 E-1 and E-3 and patrolled western German border during the "Phoney War".

World War II
World War II in Europe had begun on Friday 1 September 1939 when German forces invaded Poland. During the Battle of France on 17 May 1940, Ebeling claimed his first aerial victory when he shot down a Morane-Saulnier M.S.406 fighter near Grammont, Geraardsbergen in Dutch pronunciation. His opponent may have been a misidentified Hawker Hurricane from the Royal Air Force (RAF) No. 17 Squadron or No. 245 Squadron, which each lost an aircraft in combat near Brussels. On 28 May, during the Battle of Dunkirk, II. and III. Gruppe engaged in combat with Hurricane fighters from the Biggin Hill Wing near Ostend. Fighter pilots from the two units claimed seven aerial victories in this encounter. This figure includes a Hurricane fighter from either No. 213, No. 229 or No. 242 Squadron shot down northwest of Ostend. RAF units lost six Hurricane fighters in this battle.

On 9 June, German forces had breached the French defenses at the Somme-Aisne. That day, Ebeling claimed a M.S.406 shot down near Rouen. The aircraft was probably a Caudron C.714 from GC I/145 which lost seven aircraft. By the end of the French campaign, he had claimed 5 victories. During the initial stages of the Battle of Britain against the RAF, Ebeling shot down 10 British fighters in August 1940, including three victories on 12 August and two more on 15 August.

Squadron leader
On 22 August, the command hierarchy in JG 26 changed. Hauptmann Adolf Galland, who had commanded III. Gruppe, was appointed Geschwaderkommodore (wing commander) of JG 26. In consequence, Hauptmann Gerhard Schöpfel, who had led 9. Staffel until then, succeeded Galland as Gruppenkommandeur of III. Gruppe and Ebeling was given command of 9. Staffel as Staffelkapitän (squadron leader).

On 31 August, Ebeling claimed three aerial victories. JG 26 flew three combat air patrols to the northern banks of the Thames Estuary. Near North Weald, Ebeling claimed a No. 56 Squadron Hurricane fighter shot down at 09:50. In this encounter, his Bf 109 E-4 (Werknummer 3712—factory number) sustained combat damage, resulting in a forced landing in the English Channel. He was then rescued by a Dornier Do 18 flying boat from the Seenotdienst (sea rescue service). On a later patrol that day, Ebeling engaged combat with Hurricane fighters of the No. 85 Squadron and was credited with the destruction of two fighters northwest of Folkestone.

In September, 9. Staffel began flying fighter-bomber missions. That month, Ebeling claimed three further aerial victories. Sources provide conflicting information regarding actions on 6 and 7 September. According to Caldwell, on 6 September, Ebeling shot down a No. 303 Squadron Hurricane fighter northwest of Dover. That day, the Luftwaffe had targeted RAF airfields and aircraft factories in southern England. According to the authors Prien, Stemmer, Rodeike and Bock, this claim was filed on 7 September. On 7 September, the Luftwaffe launched a bombing campaign against the United Kingdom, predominantly against London, which was dubbed The Blitz. That day, Ebeling claimed two, only one was confirmed, No. 603 Squadron Supermarine Spitfire fighters shot down southeast of London.

On 5 November 1940, Ebeling, flying Bf 109 E-4 (Werknummer 2740), collided with his wingman Feldwebel Walter Braun, flying Bf 109 E-1 (Werknummer 3259), over Dungeness. Both pilots becoming prisoners for the rest of the war. Ebeling was awarded the Knight's Cross of the Iron Cross on this day for 18 victories in 163 missions, and the fast conversion of 9. Staffel to a fighter-bomber unit. His successor as Staffelkapitän of 9. Staffel became Oberleutnant Kurt Ruppert. Ebeling was taken to Canada where he spent the rest of the war as a prisoner of war.

Ebeling died on 30 November 1987 at Obsteig in Tyrol, Austria.

Summary of career

Aerial victory claims
Mathews and Foreman, authors of Luftwaffe Aces: Biographies and Victory Claims, researched the German Federal Archives and found records for 18 aerial victory claims, all of which were claimed on the Western Front.

Awards
 Iron Cross (1939) 2nd and 1st Class
 Knight's Cross of the Iron Cross on 5 November 1940 as Leutnant and Staffelkapitän of the 9./Jagdgeschwader 26 "Schlageter"

Notes

References

Citations

Bibliography

 
 
 
 
 
 
 
 
 
 
 
 
 

1918 births
1987 deaths
German World War II flying aces
Military personnel from Karlsruhe
Recipients of the Knight's Cross of the Iron Cross
People from the Grand Duchy of Baden
German prisoners of war in World War II held by the United Kingdom